Chris Gbandi (born April 7, 1979) is a retired Liberian footballer who is currently the head coach of the UConn Huskies men's soccer team.

Career

College 
Gbandi played college soccer at the University of Connecticut, where he was a finalist for the Hermann Trophy in 1999 and 2001, and a winner in 2000 (he was named First Team All-American during his last two years in college).

Professional 
Gbandi was drafted with the first overall pick of the 2002 MLS SuperDraft by Dallas Burn, but missed all of the 2002 season while rehabilitating a torn anterior cruciate ligament (ACL). He returned in the 2003 season, where he registered one goal and two assists after playing 22 games in a disappointing campaign for the Burn. Gbandi played in another 23 games in 2004. In 2005, Gbandi made 17 appearances, all starts, and scored what happened to be the last goal ever scored at the Cotton Bowl by an FC Dallas player. 2006 was his best season yet, Gbandi played in 28 games and earned FC Dallas's defender of the year honors. Over the off season, Gbandi had a trial with IK Start, but nothing became of it.

2007 was another good year for Gbandi, he made 21 appearances and scored a spectacular goal against Real Salt Lake.

On February 8, 2008, he completed a transfer to Norwegian club FK Haugesund, where he spent the next two seasons, scoring 5 goals in 37 appearances for the team.

Gbandi returned to the United States in 2010 when he signed with USSF Division 2 club Miami FC.

International 
It was speculated that Gbandi might cap for the United States national team, but in 2004 he accepted an offer from the Liberian national team to compete in the 2006 World Cup qualifiers, making him ineligible for the US squad.

Coaching 
Gbandi served as an assistant at UConn, Holy Cross, and Dartmouth before earning his first head coaching job at Northeastern.  He was named head coach at UConn on December 17, 2021.

Personal 
Gbandi's brother, Sandy Gbandi, is also a former professional footballer.

References

External links 

 Miami FC bio

1979 births
Living people
Liberian footballers
Liberia international footballers
FC Dallas players
UConn Huskies men's soccer players
FK Haugesund players
Miami FC (2006) players
Major League Soccer first-overall draft picks
American people of Liberian descent
Expatriate footballers in Norway
USSF Division 2 Professional League players
Major League Soccer players
People from Bong County
FC Dallas draft picks
Association football defenders
All-American men's college soccer players
Hermann Trophy men's winners
Liberian football managers
NCAA Division I Men's Soccer Tournament Most Outstanding Player winners
UConn Huskies men's soccer coaches
Dartmouth Big Green men's soccer coaches
Holy Cross Crusaders men's soccer coaches
Northeastern Huskies men's soccer coaches